His Majesty's principal secretaries of state, better known as secretaries of state, are senior ministers of the Crown in the Government of the United Kingdom. Secretaries of state head most major government departments and make up the majority of the Cabinet of the United Kingdom. There are currently 17 secretaries of state. They are all also currently members of Parliament elected to the House of Commons, although it is possible for them to be members of the House of Lords.

Legal position 
Under the Ministerial and other Salaries Act 1975, a maximum of 21 secretaries of state can receive a salary.

Legislation generally refers simply to "the secretary of state" without further elaboration.  By virtue of the Interpretation Act 1978, this phrase means "one of His Majesty’s Principal Secretaries of State". Despite there only being one secretary of state in law, in practice, each secretary of state will perforce stay within their own portfolio.

Secretaries of state, like other government ministers, are appointed through the royal prerogative.

History

Kingdom of England

The origin of the office lays in the office of the king's private secretary. However, by the Tudor period, the office's purview had become more onerous.

In 1539 or 1540, Henry VIII appointed two people to the office. After the Stuart Restoration, the practice of appointing two secretaries of state resumed. A formal division, in the form of the offices of the secretary of state for the Northern Department and the secretary of state for the Southern Department, was made in 1689, though the office was first divided into the Northern and Southern Department purviews in 1660.

After the Union
In 1782, the responsibilities of these offices were changed, so that one would be responsible for foreign affairs and one for domestic affairs, thus establishing the embryonic offices of foreign secretary and home secretary. Over time, the number of secretaries of states grew, so that there were five in 1900 and 14 by 1996. There are currently 16 secretaries of state.

Secretaries of state currently in use

Secretaries of state no longer in use

Health, education, work, business, energy, environment, transport and the regions

The secretaries of state that have been used for the matters of health, education, work, business, energy, environment, transport and the regions are shown in the graphic below. It shows how portfolios of responsibilities have been broadly passed down from one secretary of state position to the position(s) directly below it. However, it is impossible for such a graphic to be completely accurate; it cannot show smaller changes, or gains or losses of responsibilities within a position due to changes of responsibilities for the UK Government (for example, due to devolution or Brexit). It is not to scale. In the gaps, and before the first of these secretaries of state, relevant responsibilities were taken on by ministers not titled 'Secretary of State'. 

Key:

Culture
The Secretaries of state that have been used for culture, heritage and sport are as follows:

References 

Titles
Government occupations
Ministerial positions in the Government of the United Kingdom